Paul McAreavey (born 3 December 1980) is a Northern Irish football manager and former player. He previously played for Swindon Town, Linfield, Dundalk, Ballymena United and Donegal Celtic.

In May 2006 the Belfast native signed a three-year full-time deal with Linfield.

In August 2013 McAreavy returned to Donegal Celtic as manager following the departure of his predecessor Pat McAllister. McAreavey left his position in June 2014, with Nicky Maye, a coach under McAreavey, promoted to manager.

Honours
Linfield
Irish League (4): 2003-04, 2005-06, 2006-07, 2007-08
Irish Cup (3): 2005-06, 2006-07, 2007-08
Irish League Cup (2): 2005-06, 2007-08
Setanta Sports Cup (1): 2005

Notes

1980 births
Living people
Association footballers from Belfast
Association footballers from Northern Ireland
Swindon Town F.C. players
Kilkenny City A.F.C. players
Portadown F.C. players
Linfield F.C. players
Dundalk F.C. players
Donegal Celtic F.C. players
Ballymena United F.C. players
Donegal Celtic F.C. managers
English Football League players
NIFL Premiership players
League of Ireland players
Association football midfielders
Football managers from Northern Ireland